Przecławice may refer to the following places in Poland:
Przecławice, Trzebnica County in Gmina Oborniki Śląskie, Trzebnica County in Lower Silesian Voivodeship (SW Poland)
Przecławice, Wrocław County in Gmina Żórawina, Wrocław County in Lower Silesian Voivodeship (SW Poland)